Richard Kalvar (born 1944) is an American photographer who has been associated with Magnum Photos since 1975.

Kalvar has had a solo exhibition at Maison européenne de la photographie in Paris.

Life and work
Kalvar was born in Brooklyn, New York. A trip to Europe in 1966 with a Pentax camera given him by French fashion photographer Jérôme Ducrot (with whom Kalvar worked in New York as an assistant) inspired him to become a photographer. On his return to New York he worked at Modernage photo lab. Two years later he moved to Paris and joined Agence Vu photography agency.

Kalvar has worked around the world, especially in England, France, Italy, Japan and the United States.

Exhibitions

Solo exhibitions
Agathe Gaillard Gallery, Paris
2007: Terrans, Maison européenne de la photographie, Paris
2008: Retrospective, Casal Solleric, Illes Balears, Spain
2010: Earthlings: Retrospective, Städtische Galerie Iserlohn, Iserlohn, Denmark

Group exhibitions
2015: Paris Magnum, Hôtel de Ville, Paris
2017: Magnum Analog Recovery Le Bal, Paris

Publications

Publications by Kalvar
Familles en France. France: Viva, 1973.
L’Usine. France: Colgate Palmolive, 1987, .
Portrait de Conflans-Sainte-Honorine. France: P.O. Calmann-Lévy, 1993, .
Earthlings. Flammarion, 2007, .

Publications with others
Street Photography Now. London: Thames & Hudson, 2010. . Edited by Sophie Howarth and Stephen McLaren.

References

External links
 Kalvar at Magnum Photos

Living people
American photographers
1944 births
Magnum photographers
Street photographers